Ranunculus clivicola is a rare species of buttercup found in alpine Australia.

References

clivicola
Flora of New South Wales
Plants described in 1959
Taxa named by Barbara G. Briggs